Atul Bora is an Indian politician from Assam belonging to a regional party, Asom Gana Parishad. In July 2014 he was elected president of the party. Currently he is the Minister for Agriculture and Veterinary in the Cabinet of Assam Government headed by Himanta Biswa Sarma.

Early career 
Bora started his career of leadership from his student days. He was born in a family of Chutia ethnicity at Borahi Gaon, Athgaon Mouza of Golaghat District. He is the eldest son of Sri Mehuram Bora and Smti. Punya Probha Bora. He completed his primary education at Saraimoria LP School and Torfat ME school.

Thereafter he got himself admitted to Kacharihat High School from where he passed the HSLC Examination. Subsequently, he took admission in Debraj Roy College, Golaghat and after graduation, he joined Gauhati University and obtained his master's degree in Political Science and also obtained LLB Degree from Gauhati University Law College.

Political career 

Bora participated actively in the Assam Movement while he was a student. He was elected Organizing Secretary and thereafter the General Secretary of the All Assam Students Union. He was also President of the All Assam Students Union and during his tenure in the All Assam Students Union left no stone unturned to make the All Assam Students Union as powerful as it was by fighting for the genuine causes of Assam.

Bora also became the Founder Chairman of the North-East Students' Co-ordination Committee, composed of student organisations of the north-eastern states. As the Founder Chairman, Bora became instrumental in organising educational, cultural, socio-political, sports and awareness programmes in entire North-East India.

The organisation under his leadership could draw the special attention of the Central Government to various common problems faced by the North-Eastern states. Bora joined active politics by enrolling himself as an Asom Gana Parishad worker in 1995.

On 9 June 1996, he was elected as MLA from his home constituency Golaghat (Vidhan Sabha constituency). Bora also practised law for a few years till assuming charge of various responsible posts of the party such as District President, Joint Secretary, General Secretary of the Central Committee and in the year 2011 he was elected as the Working President of the party and on 15 July 2014, Bora has assumed the charge of President of the party.

Bora after taking charge of his new responsibility as the President of the party has been trying his level best to improve the position of the party by visiting various districts of Assam and has been interacting with the party workers, intellectuals, and influential persons of the state and also people representing various sections of the society.

In May 2016, Bora won the Bokakhat constituency. He was sworn in as Cabinet Minister on 24 May 2016 and has been allotted polities like agriculture, horticulture and food processing, animal husbandry and veterinary, urban development department, and town and country planning departments.

In January 2018, Assam Agriculture Minister Bora inaugurated a chief minister’s free diagnostic and laboratory services at the Swahid Kushal Konwar Civil Hospital here in a colourful ceremony in presence of the joint director of health services, ADC (H), superintendent of SKK civil hospital, representatives from HLL Lifecare Ltd and other dignitaries.

References 

Asom Gana Parishad politicians
State cabinet ministers of Assam
1960 births
Living people
Chutiya community
People from Golaghat district
Assam MLAs 2006–2011
Assam MLAs 2016–2021
Assam MLAs 2021–2026